Water Supply and Sewerage Authority or WASA is the main body administering Water supply, Drainage and Sanitation system in Bangladesh. It was established in the year 1963 as an independent organization, under the East Pakistan ordinance XIX. At present WASA operates according to the WASA act 1996.

WASAs in Bangladesh
 Chattogram WASA
 Dhaka WASA
 Khulna WASA
 Rajshahi WASA
 Sylhet WASA

References

Water supply and sanitation in Bangladesh
Government agencies of Bangladesh
Organisations based in Dhaka
Water management authorities in Bangladesh